Geoffrey Albert Wheatcroft (born 23 December 1945) is a British journalist, author, and historian.

Early life and education 
Wheatcroft is the son of Stephen Frederick Wheatcroft (1921–2016), OBE, and his first wife, Joyce (née Reed). He was born in London and raised at Hampstead. His father was an economist, serving as a governor of the London School of Economics, and an expert on civil aviation, serving as Commercial Planning manager for British Airways from 1946 to 1953, before working for various airlines as an independent consultant.

Wheatcroft was educated at University College School, London, then New College, Oxford, where he read modern history.

Publishing and journalism 
Wheatcroft started work in publishing in 1968, working for Hamish Hamilton (1968–70), Michael Joseph (1971–1973), and Cassell & Co (1974–1975). In 1975, he became the assistant editor of The Spectator, moving to the post of literary editor, which he occupied from 1977 to 1981. During the 1981–1984 period, he worked as a reporter in South Africa before becoming editor of the Londoner's Diary gossip column in the London Evening Standard in 1985–1986. He was a Sunday Telegraph columnist in 1987–1991 and freelance 1993–1996, feature writer on the Daily Express, 1996–1997, and has since written for The Guardian, The Times Literary Supplement, The New York Review of Books, The New Republic, the Boston Globe, The Atlantic, The American Conservative, and other publications on both sides of the Atlantic.

His book The Controversy of Zion won a 1996 National Jewish Book Award. His 2021 biography of Winston Churchill was described by conservative historian Andrew Roberts in The Spectator as a "character assassination"; in The New York Times, Peter Baker wrote: "They are, of course, taking different views of the same man. Roberts's book was described in these pages as the best single-volume biography of Churchill yet written. Wheatcroft's could be the best single-volume indictment of Churchill yet written."

Marriage and family 
In 1990, Wheatcroft married the fashion designer and painter Sally Muir, the daughter of Frank Muir. They live in Bath, Somerset, and have two children, Abigail and Gabriel.

Books 
 The Randlords (1985)
 Absent Friends (1989)
 The Controversy of Zion (1996)
 The Strange Death of Tory England (2005)
 Le Tour: A History of the Tour de France (2003, 2007, 2013)
 Yo, Blair! (2007)
 The Life and Afterlife of Winston Churchill (2021)

Sources 
 Who's Who (2008 edition) s.v. Geoffrey Wheatcroft

References

External links 
 Wheatcroft on The Guardian
 Biography of Geoffrey Wheatcroft on The Atlantic Monthly (accessed 24 September 2007)
 Wheatcroft author page and article archive from The New York Review of Books
 

1945 births
Alumni of New College, Oxford
British biographers
Daily Mail journalists
The Guardian journalists
Living people
People educated at University College School